Stuart Levy (30 November 1907 – 3 June 1966) was a British film producer best known for his long association with Nat Cohen with whom he founded and ran Anglo-Amalgamated, making such productions as the Edgar Wallace Mysteries. He was born in Hendon, London and died in London.

With Cohen, he co-owned the horse Anglo, which won the Grand National.

He had a daughter who took her own life in 1962.

References

External links
Anglo Amalgamated at BFI Screenonline

1907 births
1966 deaths
Film producers from London
Date of birth missing